Irina Shlemova (born March 3, 1984) is an Uzbekistani former swimmer, who specialized in sprint freestyle events. She is a two-time Olympian (2004 and 2008) and a member of Oltin Suv Swimming Club, under the tutelage of her personal coach Daniya Galandinova.

Shlemova made her first Uzbek team at the 2004 Summer Olympics in Athens, where she competed in the women's 100 m freestyle. Swimming in heat two, she picked up a sixth seed and forty-fifth overall by three hundredths of a second (0.030 behind Chinese Taipei's Sung Yi-chieh in 59.21.

At the 2008 Summer Olympics in Beijing, Shlemova qualified for the second time in the women's 100 m freestyle. She cleared a FINA B-standard entry time of 57.13 (100 m freestyle) from the Russian Championships in Saint Petersburg. Shlemova challenged five other swimmers on the same heat as Athens, including 15-year-old Quah Ting Wen of Singapore, and fellow two-time Olympian Nieh Pin-chieh of Chinese Taipei. She rounded out the field to last place by more than a second behind Nieh in 58.77 seconds. Shlemova failed to advance into the semifinals, as she placed forty-sixth overall in the prelims.

References

External links

NBC Olympics Profile

1984 births
Living people
Olympic swimmers of Uzbekistan
Swimmers at the 2004 Summer Olympics
Swimmers at the 2008 Summer Olympics
Swimmers at the 2006 Asian Games
Uzbekistani female freestyle swimmers
Sportspeople from Tashkent
Asian Games competitors for Uzbekistan
21st-century Uzbekistani women